Alfred High School may refer to:
Alfred High School (Rajkot)
Alfred High School (Bhuj)